Waldheim is an unincorporated community in St. Tammany Parish, Louisiana, United States.

Etymology
The area around Waldheim was originally called St. Boniface by a local Reverend J. Ahrens and was named after Saint Boniface. Then on December 5, 1907, the community was renamed Waldheim meaning 'forest home' in the German language.

References

Unincorporated communities in St. Tammany Parish, Louisiana
Unincorporated communities in Louisiana
Unincorporated communities in New Orleans metropolitan area